Dayeh University (DYU) is a private university in Dacun Township, Changhua County, Taiwan, and accredited by ACCSB.

History
The school was established in 1990 as Dayeh Institute of Technology by Song Gen Yeh who wanted to establish the first German-style polytechnic in Taiwan.

In August 1997, Dayeh's status as a university was approved by the Ministry of Education and it was renamed Dayeh University.

In 2007, Dayeh University won the National Solar Model Car Race. This event was organized by the Ministry of Education and attracted 41 teams from 21 local universities and colleges.

This university is the home to over 11,211 students, who study in 6 different disciplines offered by the six different colleges from the university. These colleges are:

 College of Engineering
 College of Design and Arts
 College of Management
 College of Foreign Languages
 College of Biotechnology and Bio-resources
 College of Tourism and Hospitality

The College of Nursing and Health Science was fully established in 2014. DYU has been awarded with Teaching Excellence Project from Taiwan Ministry of Education in the last few years indicating overall high teaching quality, excellent management and great potential of DYU.

Dayeh has been the host to many important events, including the 29th University and College Games, the 1st University and College College Club Expo, University President Conference, Hundred Industry Partnership-Strategy Alliances Fair, Ceremony for Industry-Academic Partnership Establishment, just to name a few.

In addition, DYU has also been awarded with Teaching Excellence Project from Ministry of Education in consecutive years, which indicates the overall teaching standard, management and potential of DYU.

DYU has performed well in academic research in recent years. According to the statistics of frequency on ESI papers in Taiwan, papers from the College of Engineering are quoted as many times as top 1% of the world. WOS statistics on papers also indicate the research potential in the areas of Mechanics, Agriculture, Materials, Biology and Immunology at DYU. The ranking of DYU has been improved to one of the world top 6% universities according to Webometrics from Span in January 2011. Exhibition of Inventions in Germany, Moscow Archimedes International Exhibition of Inventions in Russia, International Exhibition of Inventions in Italy, International Competition of Micro Institutions in Japan, and Seoul Female Film Festival in Korea. Recently at the Taipei Invention competition, students from various departments came together to represent Dayeh University. Students and Professors represented the university in the booths as shown below: BSc. Biotechnology Students, BSc. Electrical Engineering Students, Environmental Engineering Students of H801, Professor Lee: Mr. Hung (PhD candidate), Mr. Liao (Phd candidate), Mr. Elon Cadogan (PhD candidate), Mr. Huang (MSc.), Mr. Yang MSc., Founder of DaYeh University, Vice President of DaYeh University. Dean, Office of Research & Development Distinguished Professor Chen, Assistant to the Dean.

College of Engineering

Table of Achievements

2012

World Bank Notes Collection Display
Professor Ming-Kou Chuang collects nearly all of Bank Notes (paper money) from all around the world, his collections are now displayed to the public in Taipei for 4 months.

Recently, Chunghwa (where Da-Yeh is located) Government is planning to organize and build a “Bank Notes Museum” with professor Chuang.

Notable alumni
 Lego Lee, actor
 Wei Ming-ku, Magistrate of Changhua County
 Jasper Liu, actor, model and singer

See also
 List of universities in Taiwan

References

External links

Dayeh University website 

1990 establishments in Taiwan
Educational institutions established in 1990
Universities and colleges in Changhua County
Universities and colleges in Taiwan
Comprehensive universities in Taiwan